Couchiching 16A is a First Nations reserve near Fort Frances, Ontario. It is the main reserve of the Couchiching First Nation.

References

Saulteaux reserves in Ontario
Communities in Rainy River District